Nghĩa Phương may refer to several places in Vietnam, including:

 Nghĩa Phương, Bắc Giang, a rural commune of Lục Nam District.
 , a rural commune of Tư Nghĩa District.